Rêve de printemps (en. Dream of Spring) is a 1901 painting by William-Adolphe Bouguereau. The painting is an allegory of spring, it shows a young woman sitting in a forest surrounded by three small amores who crown her with a wreath of spring flowers as déesse du printemps.

See also
 William-Adolphe Bouguereau gallery

References

Mythological paintings by William-Adolphe Bouguereau
1901 paintings
Paintings in the collection of the Indianapolis Museum of Art
Paintings depicting Greek myths
Allegorical paintings by French artists
20th-century allegorical paintings
Paintings of Cupid